Village of the Branch is a village in the Town of Smithtown in Suffolk County, New York, United States. The population was 1,807 at the 2010 census. The village incorporated in 1927.

The village shares its post office and ZIP code with the nearby hamlet of Smithtown, which is also the Town seat of the Town of Smithtown.

Geography

Historic district

The village includes a  national historic district consisting of 15 houses, a church, and a library built between about 1700 and 1965. Located within the district are the Halliock Inn and First Presbyterian Church.

Demographics

As of the census of 2000, there were 1,895 people, 605 households, and 513 families residing in the village. The population density was 2,020.3 people per square mile (778.4/km2). There were 611 housing units at an average density of 651.4 per square mile (251.0/km2). The racial makeup of the village was 95.83% White, 0.16% African American, 0.05% Native American, 2.59% Asian, 0.84% from other races, and 0.53% from two or more races. Hispanic or Latino of any race were 3.01% of the population.

There were 605 households, out of which 37.5% had children under the age of 18 living with them, 76.4% were married couples living together, 6.4% had a female householder with no husband present, and 15.2% were non-families. 13.1% of all households were made up of individuals, and 5.5% had someone living alone who was 65 years of age or older. The average household size was 2.92 and the average family size was 3.19.

In the village, the population was spread out, with 23.7% under the age of 18, 5.6% from 18 to 24, 26.9% from 25 to 44, 27.1% from 45 to 64, and 16.7% who were 65 years of age or older. The median age was 41 years. For every 100 females, there were 90.1 males. For every 100 females age 18 and over, there were 84.9 males.

The median income for a household in the village was $83,036, and the median income for a family was $90,622. Males had a median income of $68,125 versus $38,125 for females. The per capita income for the village was $32,416. About 1.7% of families and 4.7% of the population were below the poverty line, including 3.1% of those under age 18 and 10.5% of those age 65 or over.

References

External links

 Village of the Branch official website

Smithtown, New York
Villages in New York (state)
Villages in Suffolk County, New York